Once a Thief is a 1950 American crime film noir directed by W. Lee Wilder starring Cesar Romero, June Havoc, Marie McDonald and Lon Chaney Jr.

Plot
Margie Moore, a miserable San Francisco woman, turns in desperation to jewel robbery. She narrowly escapes apprehension in a heist and moves to Los Angeles, where she takes an honest job as a waitress. Her troubles resume when she falls in love with smooth-talking Mitch Foster, who reveals his true colors by stealing all of her money and then informing the authorities about her.

In prison with her partner-in-crime Pearl, Margie is visited by Mitch and waitress friend Flo. Mitch continues to try to extract money from her. Margie overpowers a doctor and slips away from prison disguised in the doctor's clothes. Law-enforcement authorities look for her at Mitch's and discover his illegal activities there. Mitch tries to escape, but Margie lures him to a deserted spot and shoots him.

Cast
 Cesar Romero as Mitch Moore
 June Havoc as Margie Foster
 Marie McDonald as Flo
 Lon Chaney Jr. as Gus
 Iris Adrian as Pearl
 Jack Daly as Eddie
 Marta Mitrovich as Nickie
 Ann Tyrrell as Dr. Borden
 Michael Mark as Milton
 Kathleen Freeman as Phoebe
 Dana Broccoli as Jane (as Dana Wilson)
 Bill Baldwin as Bondsman
 Frances Blumfeld as Lt. Francis Blumfeld (as Lieutenant Frances Blumfeld)
 Gwendolph Dusuau as Deputy Gwendolph Dusuau (as Deputy Gwendolph Dusuau)
 John P. Battema as Chaplain John P. Battema (as Chaplain John P. Battema) 
 Dorris Mack as Deputy Dorris Mack (as Deputy Dorris Mack)
 Irma Kunow as Deputy Irma Kunow (as Deputy Irma Kunow)
 Lloyd C. Smith as Officer Lloyd C. Smith (as Officer Lloyd C. Smith)
 Ruth Moore as Police Sergeant Ruth Moore (as Sergeant Ruth Moore)
 Leauta Larsen as Deputy Leauta Larsen (as Deputy Leauta Larsen)

References

External links
 
 
 
 

1950 films
1950 crime drama films
American crime drama films
American black-and-white films
Film noir
Films directed by W. Lee Wilder
Films scored by Michel Michelet
United Artists films
1950s English-language films
1950s American films